The Canton of Le Grand-Bourg is a canton situated in the Creuse département and in the Nouvelle-Aquitaine region of central France.

Geography 
An area of farming and forestry in the arrondissement of Guéret, centred on the town of Le Grand-Bourg. The altitude varies from 315m (Saint-Pierre-de-Fursac) to 539m (Fleurat) with an average altitude of 389m.

Population

Composition 
At the French canton reorganisation which came into effect in March 2015, the canton was expanded from 7 to 17 communes (2 of which merged into the new commune Fursac):
 
Arrènes
Augères
Aulon
Azat-Châtenet
Bénévent-l'Abbaye
Ceyroux
Chamborand
Châtelus-le-Marcheix
Fleurat
Fursac
Le Grand-Bourg
Lizières
Marsac
Mourioux-Vieilleville
Saint-Goussaud
Saint-Priest-la-Plaine

See also 
 Arrondissements of the Creuse department
 Cantons of the Creuse department
 Communes of the Creuse department

References

Cantons of Creuse